Leduc Transit is public bus system operated by the City of Leduc and Leduc County in the Edmonton Capital Region of Alberta, Canada. The service began on September 8, 2014. The capital investment was 5.16 million dollars CAD. GreenTRIP (Green Transit Initiatives Project), a provincial fund to assist public transportation projects, has contributed 3.44 million dollars CAD. The remainder will be divided 65-35 between the City and the County respectively.

LATS, Leduc Assisted Transportation Services, is the paratransit branch that provides door to door service to the service area and was taken over by the City of Leduc in February 2007 from a not-for-profit group. A person who has a cognitive and/or physical disability or is 65 or older is able to use this service.

Facilities 
There are three park and rides located at the Leduc Recreation Centre, Alexander Arena and the Leduc County Centre.

Transit garages 
The garages and operations centre is to be located within the City of Leduc.

Routes 
The C-Line was in inter-municipal transit service where Edmonton Transit System was contracted to provide the service from the City of Leduc to Edmonton's Century Park Transit Centre and the Nisku Industrial Park. The C-Line commenced service in November 2010.

Leduc Transit commenced September 8, 2014 and is a joint venture between the City of Leduc and Leduc County. There are six routes. Route 1 serves Central Leduc, Nisku, Royal Oaks and Century Park LRT Station. Route 2 serves West Leduc and Nisku. Route 3 serves the Leduc Business Park, the hospitality area along Sparrow Crescent in Leduc and on 11 Avenue in Nisku and the Edmonton International Airport. Route 4 serves South Leduc. Route 5 serves Nisku. Each route operates on peak hours only, Monday to Friday. Route 10 provides service from Leduc (Alexandra Park) to the hotel corridor along Sparrow Drive/Sparrow Crescent to the Edmonton International Airport, Premium Outlet Collection Mall and Costco, operating on an hourly frequency seven days per week.  In 2021, all routes except for 1 and 10 were replaced by an on-demand service.

Fleet 
The fleet will consist of nine buses. The buses will have red, light blue and dark blue chevrons as its logo and styling for the buses. Each bus is a low floor bus. The four 12 metre (40 foot) buses are New Flyer Xcelsior, and the five 8 metre (26 foot) community buses are ARBOC Spirit of Mobility buses. On Route 1, free WiFi is available.

See also 

 Fort Sask Transit
 Edmonton Transit Service
 St. Albert Transit
 Strathcona County Transit
 Public transport in Canada

References

External links 
 City of Leduc, Transit Website

Transit agencies in Alberta
Bus transport in Alberta
Edmonton Metropolitan Region
Leduc, Alberta